In polymer chemistry, in situ polymerization is a preparation method that occurs "in the polymerization mixture" and is used to develop polymer nanocomposites from nanoparticles. There are numerous unstable oligomers (molecules) which must be synthesized in situ (i.e. in the reaction mixture but cannot be isolated on their own) for use in various processes. The in situ polymerization process consists of an initiation step followed by a series of polymerization steps, which results in the formation of a hybrid between polymer molecules and nanoparticles. Nanoparticles are initially spread out in a liquid monomer or a precursor of relatively low molecular weight. Upon the formation of a homogeneous mixture, initiation of the polymerization reaction is carried out by addition of an adequate initiator, which is exposed to a source of heat, radiation, etc. After the polymerization mechanism is completed, a nanocomposite is produced, which consists of polymer molecules bound to nanoparticles.

In order to perform the in situ polymerization of precursor polymer molecules to form a polymer nanocomposite, certain conditions must be fulfilled which include the use of low viscosity pre-polymers (typically less than 1 pascal), a short period of polymerization, the use of polymer with advantageous mechanical properties, and no formation of side products during the polymerization process.

Advantages and Disadvantages 
There are several advantages of the in situ polymerization process, which include the use of cost-effective materials, being easy to automate, and the ability to integrate with many other heating and curing methods. Some downsides of this preparation method, however, include limited availability of usable materials, a short time period to execute the polymerization process, and expensive equipment is required.   

The next sections will cover the various examples of polymer nanocomposites produced using the in situ polymerization technique, and their real life applications.

Clay Nanocomposites 
Towards the end of the 20th century, Toyota Motor Corp devised the first commercial application of the clay-polyamide-6 nanocomposite, which was prepared via in situ polymerization. Once Toyota laid the groundwork for polymer layered silicate nanocomposites, extensive research in this particular area was conducted afterwards. Clay nanocomposites can experience a significant increase in strength, thermal stability, and ability to penetrate barriers upon addition of a minute portion of nanofiller into the polymer matrix. A standard technique to prepare clay nancomposites is in situ polymerization, which consists of intercalation of the monomer with the clay surface, followed by initiation by the functional group in the organic cation and then polymerization. A study by Zeng and Lee investigated the role of the initiator in the in situ polymerization process of clay nanocomposites. One of the major findings was that the more favorable nanocomposite product was produced with a more polar monomer and initiator.

Carbon Nanotubes (CNT) 
In situ polymerization is an important method of preparing polymer grafted nanotubes using carbon nanotubes.

Properties 

Due to their remarkable mechanical, thermal and electronic properties, including high conductivity, large surface area, and excellent thermal stability, carbon nanotubes (CNT) have been heavily studied since their discovery to develop various real world applications. Two particular applications that carbon nanotubes have made major contributions to include strengthening composites as filler material and energy production via thermally conductive composites.

Types of CNT 
Currently, the two principal types of carbon nanotubes are single walled nanotubes (SWNT) and multi-walled nanotubes (MWNT).

Advantages of In Situ Polymerization Using CNT 
In situ polymerization offers several advantages in the preparation of polymer grafted nanotubes compared to other methods. First and foremost, it allows polymer macromolecules to attach to CNT walls. Additionally, the resulting composite is miscible with most types of polymers. Unlike solution or melt processing, in situ polymerization can prepare insoluble and thermally unstable polymers. Lastly, in situ polymerization can achieve stronger covalent interactions between polymer and CNTs earlier in the process.

Applications 
Recent improvements in the in situ polymerization process have led to the production of polymer-carbon nanotube composites with enhanced mechanical properties. With regards to their energy-related applications, carbon nanotubes have been used to make electrodes, with one specific example being the CNT/PMMA composite electrode. In situ polymerization has been studied to streamline the construction process of such electrodes. Huang, Vanhaecke, and Chen found that in situ polymerization can potentially produce composites of conductive CNTs on a grand scale. Some aspects of in situ polymerization that can help achieve this feat are that it is cost effective with regards to operation, requires minimal sample, has high sensitivity, and offers many promising environmental and bioanalytical applications.

Biopharmaceuticals 
Proteins, DNAs, and RNAs are just a few examples of biopharmaceuticals that hold the potential to treat various disorders and diseases, ranging from cancer to infectious diseases. However, due to certain undesirable properties such as poor stability, susceptibility to enzyme degradation, and insufficient capability to penetrate biological barriers, the application of such biopharmaceuticals in delivering medical treatment has been severely hindered. The formation of polymer-biomacromolecule nanocomposites via in situ polymerization offers an innovative means of overcoming these obstacles and improving the overall effectiveness of biopharmaceuticals. Recent studies have demonstrated how in situ polymerization can be implemented to improve the stability, bioactivity, and ability to cross biological barriers of biopharmaceuticals.

Types of Biomolecule Polymer Nanocomposites 
The two main types of nanocomposites formed by in situ polymerization are 1) biomolecule-linear polymer hybrids, which are linear or have a star-like shape, and contain covalent bonds between individual polymer chains and the biomolecular surface and 2) biomolecule-crosslinked polymer nanocapsules, which are nanocapsules with biomacromolecules centered within the polymer shells.

In Situ Polymerization Methods for Biomolecules 
Biomolecule-linear polymer hybrids are formed via “grafting-from” polymerization, which is an in situ approach that differs from the standard “grafting to” polymerization. Whereas “grafting to” polymerization involves the straightforward attachment of polymers to the biomolecule of choice, the “grafting from” method takes place on proteins that are pre-modified with initiators. Some examples of “grafting to” polymerization include atom transfer radical polymerization (ATRP) and reversible addition-fragmentation chain transfer (RAFT). These methods are similar in that they both lead to narrow molecular weight distributions and can make block copolymer. On the other hand, they each have distinct properties that need to be analyzed on a case-by-case basis. For example, ATRP is sensitive to oxygen whereas RAFT is insensitive to oxygen; in addition, RAFT has a much greater compatibility with monomers than ATRP.

Radical polymerization with crosslinkers is the other in situ polymerization method, and this process leads to the formation of biomolecule-crosslinked polymer nanocapsules. This process produces nanogels/nanocapsules via a covalent or non-covalent approach. In the covalent approach, the two steps are the conjugation of acryloyl groups to protein followed by in situ free radical polymerization. In the non-covalent approach, proteins are entrapped within nanocapsules.

Protein Nanogels 
Nanogels, which are microscopic hydrogel particles held together by a cross-linked polymer network, offer a desirable mode of drug delivery that has a variety of biomedical applications. In situ polymerization can be used to prepare protein nanogels that help facilitate the storage and delivery of protein. The preparation of such nanogels via the in situ polymerization method begins with free proteins dispersed in an aqueous solution along with cross-linkers and monomers, followed by addition of radical initiators, which leads to the polymerization of a nanogel polymer shell that encloses a protein core. Additional modification of the polymeric nanogel enables delivery to specific target cells. Three classes of in situ polymerized nanogels are 1) direct covalent conjugation via chemical modifications, 2) noncovalent encapsulation, and 3) cross-linking of preformed crosslinkable polymers. Protein nanogels have tremendous applications for cancer treatment, vaccination, diagnosis, regenerative medicine, and therapies for loss-of-function genetic diseases. In situ polymerized nanogels are capable of delivering the appropriate amount of protein to the site of treatment; certain chemical and physical factors including pH, temperature, and redox potential manage the protein delivery process of nanogels.

Urea Formaldehyde (UF) and Melamine Formalehyde (MF) 

Urea-formaldehyde (UF) and melamine formaldehyde (MF) encapsulation systems are other examples that utilize in situ polymerization. In such type of in situ polymerization a chemical encapsulation technique is involved very similar to interfacial coating. The distinguishing characteristic of in situ polymerization is that no reactants are included in the core material. All polymerization occurs in the continuous phase, rather than on both sides of the interface between the continuous phase and the core material. In situ polymerization of such formaldehyde systems usually involves the emulsification of an oil-phase in water. Then, water-soluble urea/melamine formaldehyde resin monomers are added, which are allowed to disperse. The initiation step occurs when acid is added to lower the pH of the mixture. Crosslinking of the resins completes the polymerization process and results in a shell of polymer-encapsulated oil droplets.

References

Polymers